Cirrus Logic Inc. is an American fabless semiconductor supplier that specializes in analog, mixed-signal, and audio DSP integrated circuits (ICs). Since 1998, the company's headquarters have been in Austin, Texas.

The company's audio processors and audio converters feature in audio and consumer entertainment products, including smartphones, tablets, digital headsets, automotive entertainment systems, home-theater receivers, and smart home applications, such as smart speakers. The company has over 3,200 customers including Ford, Harman International, Itron, LG, Lenovo, Onkyo, Marantz, Motorola, Panasonic, Pioneer, Samsung, SiriusXM, Sony, Apple, and Vizio.

Suhas Patil founded the company as "Patil Systems, Inc." in Salt Lake City in 1981; it adopted the name "Cirrus Logic" when it moved to Silicon Valley in 1984.

Cirrus Logic has more than 3,900 patents issued and pending.

History
Patil Systems, Inc., was founded in Salt Lake City, Utah, in 1981 by Suhas Patil, and in 1983 the company was reorganized by Patil, Kamran Elahian, and venture capitalist Fred Nazem, whose firm,  Nazem and Company provided the company's first/start-up round of financing. Later the company was renamed as Cirrus Logic when it moved to Silicon Valley in 1984 to focus on solutions for the growing PC components market. Michael Hackworth was named president and chief executive officer in January 1985, and served as CEO until February 1999. It joined the Nasdaq market listing in 1989 (symbol: CRUS). Cirrus Logic acquired Crystal Semiconductor, a supplier of analog and mixed-signal converter ICs, in 1991. In the early 1990s, Cirrus Logic became a supplier of PC graphics chips, audio converters and chips for magnetic storage products. David D. French joined Cirrus Logic, Inc. as president and chief operating officer in June 1998 and was named chief executive officer in February 1999. Soon after joining the company, through an acquisition strategy French repositioned the company into a premier supplier of high-performance analog and digital processing chip solutions for consumer entertainment electronics, and soon afterwards, M. Yousuf Palla joined as Vice President of Operations and Manufacturing, contributing further to its success. The company announced in April 2000 that it had completed moving its headquarters to Austin, Texas. In June 2005, Cirrus Logic sold its video products operation to an investment firm, creating privately owned Magnum Semiconductor. After French resigned in March 2007, Jason Rhode, formerly the vice president and general manager of Cirrus Logic's Mixed Signal Audio Division, was named president and CEO in May 2007. In 2014 Cirrus Logic bought Wolfson Microelectronics for approximately $467 million.

Timeline of key events
 1981 – Patil Systems Inc. is founded in Salt Lake City by Dr. Suhas Patil. Company focuses on IC solutions for the growing PC components market.
 1984 – Patil Systems Inc. renamed Cirrus Logic and moves headquarters to Silicon Valley.
 1989 – Company goes public and is listed on the Nasdaq exchange under the ticker symbol CRUS.
 1991 – Cirrus Logic acquires Crystal Semiconductor, a supplier of analog and mixed-signal converter ICs.
 1992 – Cirrus Logic completes deal for Acumos Inc.
 1998 – Cirrus Logic exits from the PC graphics card business.
 1998 – David D. French joins company as president and chief operating officer in June and becomes chief executive officer in February 1999. In the fall, company spins out its communication business unit.
 2000 – Cirrus Logic moves its headquarters to Austin, Texas.
 2001 – Cirrus Logic announces plan to begin exit from magnetic storage chip business.
 2001 – Cirrus Logic acquires several start-up companies with technologies in video decoding, video encoding, wireless networking, and networked digital audio.
 2003 – Cirrus Logic closes wireless networking operations.
 2005 – Cirrus Logic sells video product assets to investment firm, creating Magnum Semiconductor (company maintains minority equity position).
 2007 – Jason Rhode, formerly vice president and general manager of Cirrus' Mixed-Signal Audio division, is named president and chief executive officer, replacing French who resigned in March. In July, Cirrus Logic acquires Apex Microtechnology, a provider of high-power products for industrial and aerospace markets. Cirrus Logic acquires audio chip company Tripath after they went bankrupt.
 2012 – Company sells its hybrid product line in Tucson, Ariz., to a group of investors, creating Apex Microtechnology as a stand-alone company once again. In November, the company announces that it is moving its remaining product line team in Tucson to its Austin headquarters.
 2014 – Cirrus Logic acquires UK-based Wolfson Microelectronics, an audio IC company founded in 1984.
 2021 – Jason Rhode steps down as CEO to be replaced by John Forsyth who was previously chief strategy officer.

Graphics history
In the early 1990s, Cirrus Logic was a supplier of low-cost PC graphics chips. Cirrus's Microsoft Windows 2D GUI accelerators (GDI) were among the fastest in the low-end market-segment, outperforming competing VGA chips from Oak Technologies, Trident Microsystems, and Paradise (Western Digital). For example, the Cirrus GD5422 (1992) supported hardware acceleration for both 8-bit color and 16-bit color. It was one of the lowest-priced SVGA controllers to support both.

By the mid-1990s, when PCs had migrated to the PCI bus, Cirrus had fallen behind S3 and Trident Microsystems. When the announced release date of the GD5470 "Mondello" came and went, Cirrus's reputation in desktop PC-graphics suffered. Mondello development took a back seat to the GD5464 which was near completion and proved to be a much faster design with the use of Rambus. (Because of this Mondello never got off the ground.)

The company's final graphics chips, the GD546x "Laguna" series of PCI/AGP 3D-accelerators, were novel in that they were one of the few video cards to use Rambus RDRAM. The patented use of tiled memory by the GD546x chips is still used by nearly all graphics processors today. However, like many other 2D and 3D chips at the time were gate limited by the process technology available at the time, the feature set of perspective-correct texture mapping, bilinear filtering, single-pass lighting, gouraud shading, and alpha blending, was incomplete compared to the next generation of 3D chips. The GD546x family was limited by CPU processing at the time, CPUs could not feed it enough triangles which was the real performance block. The raw processing power of the GD546x was nearly 2.5 million 25 pixel triangles per second, much faster than competitors.

When Intel announced they were entering the 3D market with the i740, Cirrus Logic exited the market, which at the time for Cirrus Logic was worth 500 million dollars annually. (Intel didn't catch up in performance for many years, the i740 was not widely accepted and did not win any major designs).

Cirrus Logic graphic cards are used in emulators. Both QEMU and Bochs emulate the Cirrus CLGD 5446 PCI VGA-card, with Bochs additionally emulating the CL-GD5430 ISA card.

Graphics chipsets

Desktop

 CL-GD410 + CL-GD420 – ISA SVGA chipset, Video 7 VEGA VGA (1987)
 CL-GD510 + CL-GD520 – ISA SVGA "Eagle II" chipset; known for 100% CGA emulation (1988)
 CL-GD5320 – ISA SVGA chipset (1990)
 CL-GD5401 – ISA SVGA chipset, also known as Acumos VGA (AVGA1)
 CL-GD5402 – ISA SVGA chipset, also known as Acumos VGA (AVGA2)
 CL-GD5410 – ISA SVGA chipset, low-to-mid-end DRAM-based cards (accelerated), some laptop chipsets. Known for integrating graphics card components into one chip (built-in RAMDAC and clock generators) at an early point. (1991)
 CL-GD5420 – ISA SVGA chipset; highly integrated (15 bit RAMDAC + PLL), 1 MB
 CL-GD5421 – ISA SVGA chipset; highly integrated (15/16 bit RAMDAC + PLL), 1 MB
 CL-GD5422 – Enhanced version of the CL-GD5420 (32-bit internal memory interface, 15/16/24 bit RAMDAC. An ISA video card carrying this chipset offered 1280×1024 interlaced max resolution.
 CL-GD5424 – VLB version of the CL-GD5422, but resembles the CL-GD5426 in some respects
 CL-GD5425 – True color VGA controller with TV out
 CL-GD5426 – Hardware BitBLT engine; ISA bus and VLB up to 2 MB of memory
 CL-GD5428 – Enhanced version of the CL-GD5426; faster BITBLT engine
 CL-GD5429 – Enhanced version of the CL-GD5428; supports higher memory clock and has memory-mapped I/O
 CL-GD5430 – Similar to CL-GD5429, but with CL-GD543x core (32-bit host interface)
 CL-GD5434 – PCI Alpine family chip with 64-bit internal memory interface; only supports 64-bit mode if equipped with 2 MB of video memory; commonly equipped with 1 MB, extendable to 2 MB (1994)
 CL-GD5436 – An optimized CL-GD5434
 CL-GD5440 – CL-GD5430 with motion-video acceleration (CL-GD54M40 has integrated filters)
 CL-GD5446 – 64-bit Alpine VisualMedia accelerator, 2D-only; adds motion-video acceleration to the CL-GD5436
 CL-GD546X – The Laguna VisualMedia family of 2D, 3D, and video accelerators. '64 and '65 include 3D acceleration (PCI, AGP). These chips use a single channel of RDRAM memory, providing up to 600 MB/s bandwidth. The '62 lacks 3D acceleration. All include a BitBLT engine, video windows, and 64×64 hardware cursor.
 CL-GD5480 – 64-bit Alpine accelerator with 100 MHz SGRAM

Mobile

 CL-GD610 + 620 (1989)
 CL-GD6420/6440 – Used in some laptops; similar to older Cirrus chipsets (5410/AVGA2)
 CL-GD6205/6215/6225/6235 – Compatible with the CL-GD5420
 CL-GD7541/7542/7543/7548 – Compatible with the CL-GD5428/3x

See also
 Graphics card
 Graphics processing unit

References

External links
 

Fabless semiconductor companies
Graphics hardware companies
American companies established in 1981
Electronics companies established in 1981
1981 establishments in Utah
Manufacturing companies based in Austin, Texas
Companies listed on the Nasdaq
Semiconductor companies of the United States
American brands